Sugar Grove may refer to the following places in the United States:

Sugar Grove, Illinois, a village
Sugar Grove, Schuyler County, Illinois, an unincorporated community
Sugar Grove, Indiana, an unincorporated community
Sugar Grove, North Carolina, an unincorporated community
Sugar Grove, Ohio, Fairfield County, a village
Sugar Grove, Clark County, Ohio, an unincorporated community
Sugar Grove, Pennsylvania, a borough
Sugar Grove, Virginia, Smyth County, a census designated place
Sugar Grove, Montgomery County, Virginia, an unincorporated community
Sugar Grove, West Virginia, a small community
Sugar Grove, Wisconsin, an unincorporated community
Sugar Grove Township (disambiguation), various townships
Sugar Grove Station, a National Security Agency facility near Sugar Grove, West Virginia